Cangetta hartoghialis is a moth in the family Crambidae. It was described by Snellen in 1872. It is found in the Democratic Republic of Congo and Sri Lanka.

References

Moths described in 1872
Spilomelinae